Omkar Nath Dhar (24 October 1915  – 10 June 1987), better known by his stage name Jeevan, was an Indian actor. He played the role of Narad Muni in mythological films of the 1950s a total of 49 times. Later, he played the villain in popular Bollywood films of the 1960s, 1970s, and 1980s. His son Kiran Kumar (born Deepak Dhar) is also a film and television actor.

Early life
Jeevan was born into an aristocratic Kashmiri Pandit family. His grandfather, a nobleman, served as the Governor of the Gilgit Agency. His mother died during childbirth and he lost his father when he was just three years old.

Career
From an early age, Jeevan wanted to be an actor as films had always fascinated him. Since his grandfather was the Governor, their family was considered among the nobility. As a son of such a family, joining films would not have been accepted as films were considered taboo, so Jeevan ran away from home at the age of 18 and came to Bombay with only Rs. 26 in his pocket.

After a brief period of struggle, he eventually landed himself a job in the studios of Mohan Sinha (Vidya Sinha's grandfather). His job was to stick silver paper on the reflectors. It was here while working as a reflector boy that he landed a lead role in the movie Fashionable India, which was being made by Mohan Sinha.

It is said that he has played Narad Muni in more than 60 films and theater shows of different languages. He became notable otherwise for his roles in Romantic India in 1935, Afasana in 1946 and Station Master in 1942. Jeevan appeared in several Dev Anand films from 1946 to 1978 and in Manmohan Desai movies such as Amar Akbar Anthony and Dharam Veer as villains. He also starred in the Punjabi film Teri Meri Ek Jindri. His last movie was Insaaf Ki Manzil, released in 1986, produced by Ram Nandan Prasad and Directed by Braj Bhushan. He died on 10 June 1987 at the age of 71.

Selected filmography

References

External links
 

1915 births
1987 deaths
Indian Hindus
Indian people of Kashmiri descent
Kashmiri Hindus
Kashmiri Pandits
Kashmiri people
Kashmiri Brahmins
Male actors in Hindi cinema
People from Srinagar
20th-century Indian male actors